Gerosa was a comune (municipality) in the Province of Bergamo in the Italian region of Lombardy, located about  northeast of Milan and about  northwest of Bergamo.

Gerosa bordered the following municipalities: Blello, Brembilla, Corna Imagna, Fuipiano Valle Imagna, San Giovanni Bianco, San Pellegrino Terme, Taleggio.
In 2014 the municipality of Gerosa was merged with Brembilla and the new municipality is named Val Brembilla.

Demographic evolution

References